Szuper Beton is a UCI Continental cycling team, registered in Hungary. The team participates in UCI Continental Circuits races.

Team roster

Major wins

2010
Overall Giro della Provincia di Reggio Calabria, Matteo Montaguti
Stage 1, Matteo Montaguti
Gran Premio di Lugano, Roberto Ferrari
Giro del Friuli, Roberto Ferrari
Overall Tour of Japan, Cristiano Salerno
Stage 2 & 5, Cristiano Salerno
Stage 3 & 7, Claudio Cucinotta
Stage 5 Brixia Tour, Roberto Ferrari
Trofeo Matteotti, Riccardo Chiarini
2012
Stages 2 & 7 Vuelta a Colombia, Marco Zanotti
2013
 Road Race Championships, Krisztián Lovassy
Giro del Medio Brenta, Federico Rocchetti
Central European Tour Budapest GP, Krisztián Lovassy
2014
 Road Race Championships, Balázs Rózsa
2015
 Time Trial Championships, Viktor Filutás

References

External links

UCI Continental Teams (Europe)
Cycling teams based in Hungary
Cycling teams established in 2010
Former UCI Professional Continental teams
Defunct cycling teams based in Ireland